José Guadalupe Padilla Lozano, (December 12, 1920 – September 8, 2013) was a Mexican prelate of the Roman Catholic Church.

Lozano was born in San Miguel El Alto, Mexico and ordained a priest on April 20, 1946, from the Archdiocese of Guadalajara. Lozano was appointed the first bishop of newly created Diocese of Veracruz on January 15, 1963, and ordained bishop on March 19, 1963. Lozano served the Diocese of Veracruz until his retirement on February 18, 2000.

References

External links
Catholic-Hierarchy
Archdiocese of Guadalajara (Spanish)

20th-century Roman Catholic bishops in Mexico
Participants in the Second Vatican Council
1920 births
2013 deaths